Point Samson is a small coastal settlement 1,579 km north of Perth and 18 km north of Roebourne in the Pilbara region of Western Australia. The town is a popular holiday location for the nearby mining towns, including Wickham, Karratha and Dampier. Fishing is the main industry.

From 1938 to 1966 blue asbestos or crocidolite was carried here by rail from Wittenoom for shiploading by Australian Blue Asbestos Pty. Ltd.

The townsite was investigated for further development in the 1980s.

The population of Point Samson was 231 at the 2016 census, down from 298 in 2011 and 274 in 2006.

References

External links

City of Karratha
Coastal towns in Western Australia
Fishing communities in Australia